Mala Moštanica is a village located in the municipality of Obrenovac, Belgrade, Serbia. As of 2011 census, it has a population of 1,805 inhabitants.

Duboko forest 

Mala Moštanica is separated from the Sava river by the Duboko forest. The forest spread in the areas of the neighboring settlements, but the majority is located in Mala Moštanica: Umka and Rucka in the Čukarica municipality on the east, and Barič in the Obrenovac municipality, on the west. Area along the river is a mass wasting zone. Downhill creep is located on the slope above the river, and is one of the largest and most active in Belgrade. Majority is located in Umka, though, where the entire neighborhood of Duboko developed on creeping soil.

The thick oak forest was cleared, leaving a barren area which was covered by dense black locust grove. Residents and local ecology groups, some specifically founded for monitoring Duboko, protested. The company also stated that they will conduct forestation on  each year, claiming it is optimal given the mass wasting. They also said that the local politicians were notified of the cutting, that the company has an FSC certificate which mens they know what they are doing, and that public calls to stop cutting the forest are unscientific. Citizens also asked for neutral experts to check the forest, and demanded for the "Srbijašume" to place guards, ramps, and cameras, to clean the garbage, arrange the pathways, and arrange the wild locust grove which formed.

References

Populated places in Serbia